Glaciarcula is a genus of brachiopods belonging to the family Laqueidae.

The species of this genus are found in Northern Europe.

Species:

Glaciarcula friellei 
Glaciarcula spitzbergensis

References

Brachiopod genera
Terebratulida